Charlotte Ingemann (born 3 September 1946) is a Danish equestrian. She competed in two events at the 1972 Summer Olympics.

References

External links
 

1946 births
Living people
Danish female equestrians
Danish dressage riders
Olympic equestrians of Denmark
Equestrians at the 1972 Summer Olympics
Sportspeople from Copenhagen